Union Grove Schoolhouse is a historic one-room school building in Dickens, Allegany County, Maryland. It is a one-story frame building, rectangular in plan, containing a single classroom and an entrance vestibule. It is the last remaining one-room schoolhouse on its original site and in unaltered condition in Allegany County.

It was listed on the National Register of Historic Places in 1979.

References

External links
, including photo in 1979, at Maryland Historical Trust
https://www.times-news.com/allegany_magazine/allegany-magazine-september-2020-returning-to-the-one-room-and-two-room-schoolhouses-of-yesteryear/article_8bc2a6ae-ed41-11ea-9fa2-0f875bfa36eb.html

Defunct schools in Maryland
One-room schoolhouses in Maryland
Schoolhouses in the United States
Buildings and structures in Cumberland, Maryland
School buildings on the National Register of Historic Places in Maryland
National Register of Historic Places in Allegany County, Maryland